The 1971 World Junior Wrestling Championships were the second edition of the World Junior Wrestling Championships and were held in Tokyo, Japan 1971.

Medal table

Medal summary

Men's freestyle

Men's Greco-Roman

References

External links 
 UWW Database
FILA Database

W
World Junior Championships
Wrestling in Japan